NetInfo is the system configuration database in NeXTSTEP and Mac OS X versions up through Mac OS X v10.4 "Tiger". NetInfo replaces most of the Unix system configuration files, though they are still present for running the machine in single user mode; most Unix APIs wrap around NetInfo instead. NetInfo stores system wide network-type configuration information, such as users and groups, in binary databases; while Mac OS X machine and application specific settings are stored as plist files.

History
NetInfo was introduced in NeXTSTEP version 0.9, and replaced both the Unix system configuration files and Sun Microsystems' Network Information Service (Yellow Pages) on NeXT computers.  It immediately caused controversy, much unfavorable.  Not only was NetInfo unique to NeXT computers (although NeXT later licensed NetInfo to Xedoc, an Australian software company who produced NetInfo for other UNIX systems), DNS queries went through NetInfo.  This led to a situation where basic tasks such as translating a UNIX UID to a user name string would not complete because NetInfo was stalled on a DNS lookup.  At first, it was possible to disable NetInfo and use the Unix system files, but as of NeXTSTEP version 2 disabling NetInfo also disabled DNS support.  Thus, NeXT computers became notorious for locking a user out of everyday tasks because a DNS server had stopped responding.

The Mac OS X version of NetInfo remedied this (and many other problems), but due to the early problems, NetInfo never took over the world of Unix system configuration.

Apple has moved away from using NetInfo towards LDAP, particularly in Mac OS X Server. . Mac OS X v10.4 is the last version to support Netinfo. Beginning with Mac OS X v10.5, Netinfo has been completely phased out and replaced by a new local search node named dslocal, which files are located in /var/db/dslocal/ and are standard property list (XML-based) files.

Files

As Netinfo has been completely removed from Mac OS X 10.5, the Netinfo-based command line tools have also been phased out and replaced by other tools. Also, Netinfo Manager has been removed.

Data
Netinfo stores the following data:
 afpuser_aliases
 aliases
 exports  (nfs shares)
 groups
 machines
 mounts
 networks
 printers
 protocols
 rpcs
 services
 users

See also
 Apple Open Directory

References

External links
NetInfo man page

MacOS
NeXT
Directory services